Cotylocara is a genus of primitive odontocete from late Oligocene (Chattian) marine deposits of the Chandler Bridge Formation of South Carolina belonging to Xenorophidae.

Paleobiology
Cotylocara was capable of echolocation like modern dolphins, as evidenced by its dense, thick and downturned rostrum, air sac fossae, cranial asymmetry, and exceptionally broad maxillae.

References

Oligocene cetaceans
Fossil taxa described in 2014